Elisabeth "Elisa" Charlotte Constanzia von  der Recke (née von Medem; 20 May 1754 – 13 April 1833) was a Baltic German writer and poet.

Family
Elisa von der Recke was born in Schönberg, Skaistkalne parish, Courland (present-day Skaistkalne, Vecumnieki Municipality, Latvia), the daughter of Graf (later Reichsgraf) Johann Friedrich von Medem (1722-1785) and his wife, Luise Dorothea von Korff (1736-1757). Her younger half-sister was Dorothea von Medem, for whom she carried out diplomatic work. In 1771 she married Kammerherr Georg Peter Magnus von der Recke (1739-1795), living with him at Neuenburg Castle (now Jaunpils Castle). She separated from him in 1776 and divorced in 1781. Their daughter, Frederika von der Recke, died in 1777.

Life
In 1787 her first book, Nachricht von des berüchtigten Cagliostro Aufenthalt in Mitau im Jahre 1779 und dessen magischen Operationen, a memoir-exposé of the months when she studied magic with "Count" Alessandro di Cagliostro, made a great impact right across Europe, with Catherine the Great even granting Elisa lands in Russia in recognition of the work (making Elisa financially independent). She got to know Goethe, Schiller, Wieland, Herder and other European literary figures, and intensified their relationships through prolific correspondence.

From 1798 she lived almost exclusively in Dresden, and from 1804 cohabited there with her  friend Christoph August Tiedge.  Their meetings were religio-sentimentalist in tone, with the singing of chorales by Johann Gottlieb Naumann.  Her works consisted mainly of pietist-sentimentalist poems, journals and memoirs.

Elisa von der Recke looked after thirteen foster daughters.

Works
 Nachricht von des berüchtigten Cagliostro Aufenthalt in Mitau im Jahre 1779 und dessen magischen Operationen, 1787 
 Johann Lorenz Blessig (Hrsg.): Leben des Grafen Johann Friedrich von Medem nebst seinem Briefwechsel hauptsächlich mit der Frau Kammerherrinn von der Recke, seiner Schwester, 1792 (Digitalisat)
 Familien=Scenen oder Entwickelungen auf dem Masquenballe, ca. 1794, published in 1826 (Digitalisat)
 Über Naumann, den guten Menschen und großen Künstler, article in  Neuen Deutschen Merkur, 1803

Posthumously published
Geistliche Lieder, Gebete und religiöse Betrachtungen, Teubner, Leipzig 1841
Elisa von der Recke. Band 1. Aufzeichnungen und Briefe aus ihren Jugendtagen, hrsg. von Paul Rachel, 2. Auflage 1902
Elisa von der Recke. Band 2. Tagebücher und Briefe aus ihren Wanderjahren, hrsg. von Paul Rachel, 1902
Herzensgeschichten einer baltischen Edelfrau. Erinnerungen und Briefe, Lutz, Stuttgart 1921
Tagebücher und Selbstzeugnisse, hrsg. v. Christine Träger, Köhler und Amelang, Leipzig / Beck, München 1984,

Gallery

Notes

References

 Michelle S. James and Rob McFarland: "Collaborating with Spirits: Cagliostro, Elisa von der Recke, and the Phantoms of Unmündigkeit" in Laura Deiulio and John Lyon (Eds.) Gender, Collaboration, and Authorship in German Culture: Literary Joint Ventures 1750-1850, New York: Bloomsbury, 2019.  101-138.

External links

 
 Nachweis von digitalisierten Zeitschriftenbeiträgen at Litlinks
 Article on Stadtwiki Dresden about Elisa von der Recke
 The Sophie Project, Elisa von der Recke

1754 births
1833 deaths
People from Bauska Municipality
People from the Duchy of Courland and Semigallia
Baltic-German people
German women poets
Baltic nobility
18th-century Latvian people
19th-century Latvian people
European salon-holders